1-(2-Dimethylaminoethyl)dihydropyrano(3,2-e)indole (4,5-DHP-DMT) is a tricyclic tryptamine derivative which acts as a potent and reasonably selective partial agonist for the serotonin receptor 5-HT, with a Ki of 17.0 nM, and moderate selectivity over related serotonin receptors. It has lower 5-HT affinity and efficacy than the related compound AL-37350A, but higher lipophilicity.

See also
 4,5-MDO-DMT
 4,5-MDO-DiPT
 5-MeO-DMT
 CP-132,484
 RU-28306

References 

Serotonin receptor agonists
Tryptamines
Dihydropyrans
Heterocyclic compounds with 3 rings
Dimethylamino compounds